The women's doubles of the 2010 ECM Prague Open tournament was played on clay in Prague, Czech Republic. 

Alona Bondarenko and Kateryna Bondarenko were the defending champions, but both chose not to participate.Timea Bacsinszky and Tathiana Garbin won this year's event after a final victory over Monica Niculescu and Ágnes Szávay 7–5, 7–6(7–4).

Seeds

Draw

Draw

External links
Main Draw

ECM Prague Open - Doubles
2010 - Doubles